Drexell R. Davis (July 19, 1921 – December 16, 2009) was a Democrat who held several elected offices in Kentucky. He was born in Shelby County, Kentucky.

For 100 years (1891–1992) the Kentucky Constitution did not allow any holder of statewide office to succeed themselves for a second consecutive term.  As a result, a handful of Kentucky politicians became known as "musical chairs" officeholders because they would run for one statewide office and then another repeatedly. Thelma Stovall, Frances Jones Mills and Drex Davis were the best known musical chairs officeholders.  The three often traded offices in given election years through the 1970s and 1980s.

Clerk of the Court of Appeals
Davis began his career in statewide elective office by winning election as Clerk of the Kentucky Court of Appeals in 1963 on the Democratic ticket headed by Edward T. Breathitt.  (Clerk of the Court of Appeals was a partisan elective office into the 1970s in Kentucky). Davis served as Clerk from 1964 to 1968.  Davis ran for Kentucky State Treasurer in 1967, but lost.

Treasurer and Secretary of State
Davis won election as Kentucky State Treasurer in 1971 on a ticket headed by Wendell H. Ford and served in that office 1972–1976. He then ran for Secretary of State in 1975 on a ticket headed by Julian Carroll and won, serving 1976–1980.  Davis then ran for State Treasurer again in 1979 on a ticket headed by John Y. Brown, Jr. and won, serving 1980–1984.  Davis' last elective office was Secretary of State of Kentucky, which he won in 1983 on a ticket headed by Martha Layne Collins, serving 1984–1988.

Retirement
In 1991, Davis' son Drexell R. Davis Jr. ran for state treasurer but lost in a crowded Democratic primary to Frances Jones Mills who had held the office previously.

Davis died on December 16, 2009 in Frankfort, Kentucky.

References

Further reading

External links
Davis' biography from the Kentucky Secretary of State website

|-

1921 births
2009 deaths
People from Shelby County, Kentucky
Kentucky Democrats
State treasurers of Kentucky
Secretaries of State of Kentucky
20th-century American politicians